Naif Mubarak (Arabic:نايف مبارك) (born 6 August 1990) is a Qatari footballer. He currently plays for Al-Khor .

References

Qatari footballers
1990 births
Living people
El Jaish SC players
Al-Sailiya SC players
Al-Khor SC players
Qatar Stars League players
Association football fullbacks